Dicheniotes katonae is a species of tephritid or fruit flies in the genus Dicheniotes of the family Tephritidae. Named after the Hungarian zoologist, Kalman Kittenberger's pseudonym, Katona.

Distribution
Kenya, Tanzania, South Africa.

References

Tephritinae
Insects described in 1924
Diptera of Africa
Taxa named by Mario Bezzi